The 2019–20 Ekstraklasa (also known as PKO Ekstraklasa due to sponsorship reasons) was the 94th season of the Polish Football Championship, the 86th season of the highest tier domestic division in the Polish football league system since its establishment in 1927 and the 12th season of the Ekstraklasa under its current title. The league was operated by the Ekstraklasa SA.

The regular season was played as a round-robin tournament. A total of 16 teams participated, 14 of which competed in the league during the previous season, while the remaining two were promoted from the 2018–19 I liga. It is the third Ekstraklasa season to use VAR. The season started on 19 July 2019 and concluded on 19 July 2020 (the fixtures were announced on 3 June 2019 and revised on 13 May 2020 due to the outbreak of COVID-19 pandemic). After the 20th matchday the league went on a winter break between 23 December 2019 and 8 February 2020. On 13 March 2020, the Ekstraklasa SA suspended the league due to the outbreak of COVID-19 pandemic. After consultation with the Polish government, the league resumed behind closed doors without any spectators on 29 May 2020. All matches of 31–37 round have been played with "no more than 25 percent of the number of seats allocated to the public".

Each team played a total of 30 matches in the regular season, half at home and half away. After the 30th round, the league split into two groups: championship round (top eight teams) and relegation round (bottom eight teams). Each team played 7 more games (teams ranked 1 to 4 and 9 to 12 played four times at home). Therefore, each team played a total of 37 matches. The team at the top of the Championship round won the league title. However, the rules for promotion and relegation from the league have changed: starting from the 2019–20 season, three teams were relegated from Ekstraklasa to I liga, while from the I liga to Ekstraklasa two teams advanced directly, while teams from 3-6 places fought in a play-off where the winner was awarded with a promotion to Ekstraklasa.

The defending champions were Piast Gliwice, who won their 1st Polish title the previous season. The two clubs promoted were Raków Częstochowa, returning to Ekstraklasa after 21 years, as well as ŁKS Łódź, who make a return to Ekstraklasa after 7 years. Legia Warsaw clinched their fourteenth Ekstraklasa title on the twenty eight matchday of the season, after a 2–0 win against Cracovia.

Teams
A total of 16 teams participated in the 2019–20 edition of the Ekstraklasa.

Changes from last season

Stadiums and locations
Note: Table lists in alphabetical order.

 Upgrading to 31,871.
 Upgrading to 21,163.
 Due to the renovation of the Municipal Football Stadium "Raków" in Częstochowa, Raków played home matches at the GIEKSA Arena in Bełchatów.

Personnel and kits

Managerial changes

Effects of the COVID-19 pandemic

From 19 June 2020, it was possible for spectators to take 25% of possible seats. This regulation come into force by matchday 31.

Regular season

League table

Positions by round

Results

Play-offs

Championship round

League table

Positions by round

Results

Relegation round

League table

Positions by round

Results

Season statistics

Top goalscorers

Top assists

Clean sheets

Hat-tricks

Individual statistics

 Youngest footballer this season: Kacper Urbański 15 years, 105 days
 Oldest footballer this season: Marcin Wasilewski 40 years, 39 days
 Youngest goal scorer this season: Iwo Kaczmarski 16 years, 93 days
 Oldest goal scorer this season: Ľubomír Guldan 37 years, 156 days

Attendances

Before COVID-19 pandemic (after 26th round)

Total attendances

Awards

Monthly awards

Player of the Month

Young player of the Month

Coach of the Month

Annual awards

Number of teams by region

See also
2019–20 I liga
2019–20 II liga
2019–20 III liga
2019–20 Polish Cup
2019 Polish SuperCup

Notes

References

External links
 
Ekstraklasa at uefa.com

Ekstraklasa seasons
1
Poland
Ekstraklasa